Sir Hugh Maxwell Casson  (23 May 1910 – 15 August 1999) was a British architect. He was also active as an interior designer, as an artist, and as a writer and broadcaster on twentieth-century design. He was the director of architecture for the 1951 Festival of Britain. From 1976 to 1984, he was president of the Royal Academy.

Life 

Casson was born in London on 23 May 1910, spending his early years in Burma—where his father was posted with the Indian Civil Service—before being sent back to England for education. He was the nephew of actor, Sir Lewis Casson and his wife, the actress Sybil Thorndike. Casson studied at Eastbourne College in East Sussex, then St John's College, Cambridge (1929–31), after which he spent time at the Bartlett School of Architecture in London and the British School at Athens. He met his future wife, Margaret Macdonald Troup (1913-1995), an architect and designer who taught design at the Royal College of Art, while they were both students. The couple had three daughters.

Work 

Before the Second World War, he divided his time between teaching at the Cambridge School of Architecture and working in the London office of his Cambridge tutor, Christopher (Kit) Nicholson. He wrote the book New Sights of London in 1938 for London Transport, championing modern architecture within reach of London, while remaining critical of the UK's record in innovative building. "He does not mince his words", commented the Architect and Building News on the cover. During the war, he worked in the Camouflage Service of the Air Ministry.

Casson was appointed to his role as director of architecture of the Festival of Britain on the South Bank in 1948 at the age of 38, and set out to celebrate peace and modernity through the appointment of other young architects. For example, the Modernist design of the Royal Festival Hall was led by a 39-year-old, Leslie Martin. Casson's Festival achievements led to his being made a (Knight Bachelor) in 1952.

After the war, and alongside his Festival work, Casson went into partnership with young architect Neville Conder. Their projects included corporate headquarters buildings, university campuses, the Elephant House at London Zoo, a building for the Royal College of Art (where Casson was Professor of Interior Design from 1955 to 1975, and later served as Provost), the Microbiology Building (Belfast), and the master planning and design of the Sidgwick Avenue arts faculty buildings for the University of Cambridge, including the Austin Robinson Building which houses the Faculty of Economics as well as the Marshall Library of Economics. This latter project lasted some 30 years.

He was friends with members of the British royal family, and reportedly taught watercolour painting to Prince Charles. In 1955, he designed the interiors for the royal yacht Britannia; he also designed interiors for suites at Buckingham Palace and at Windsor Castle.

From 1953 to 1975 he was professor of environmental design at the Royal College of Art, where his wife Margaret was senior tutor. 

In the 1980s Casson became a television presenter, with his own series, Personal Pleasures with Sir Hugh Casson, about stately homes and places he enjoyed.

Casson supplied watercolour illustrations for a new edition of Sir John Betjeman's verse autobiography Summoned by Bells (1960); The Illustrated "Summoned by Bells" was published by John Murray in 1989.

Reception 

After his work for the Festival of Britain, Casson was knighted in the New Year Honours of 1952. He was made a Knight Commander of the Royal Victorian Order in 1978, and a Companion of Honour in 1985.

He was elected an associate member of the Royal Academy in 1962, and a full member in 1970. He was treasurer in 1975–1976, and president from 1976 to 1984. During the Summer Exhibition the academy awards an annual Hugh Casson Drawing Prize "for an original work on paper in any medium, where the emphasis is clearly on drawing", and a room in the Keeper's House is named after him.

Private Eye magazine gives the Sir Hugh Casson Award for the "Worst New Building of the Year".

An archive of his papers is held by the Victoria & Albert Museum. Photographs attributed to Casson are held in the Conway Library at The Courtauld Institute of Art, London, whose archive, of primarily architectural images, is being digitised under the wider Courtauld Connects project.

Selected publications 

 Hugh Casson's Oxford, London : Phaidon, 1998, ISBN 0714838101
 Hugh Casson's Cambridge, London : Phaidon, 1992, ISBN 0714824593
 Hugh Casson's London, London : Dent, 1983, 
 The Tower of London : an artist's portrait, with additional text ("An historian's viewpoint") by Richard White, London : Herbert Press in association with HM Tower of London, 1993, 
 Sketch book : a personal choice of London buildings, drawn 1971-1974 with introduction by John Betjeman, London : Lion and Unicorn Press, 1975, 
 Diary, Hugh Casson, London : Macmillan, 1981, 
 Nanny Says, as recalled by Sir Hugh Casson and Joyce Grenfell, ed. Diana, Lady Avebury, London : Dobson, 1972, 
 Bridges, London : Chatto, 1963.
 Monuments, London : Chatto, 1963.
 Red Lacquer Days. An illustrated journal describing a recent journey to Peking, London : Lion & Unicorn Press, 1956
 An Introduction to Victorian Architecture, London : Art and Technics, 1948
 Homes by the Million. An account of the housing achievement in the U.S.A., 1940-1945, Harmondsworth : Penguin, 1946
 New Sights of London: The Handy Guide to Contemporary Architecture, London : Westminster : London Transport Publications, 1938  

Casson also illustrated many books; perhaps the most famous being The Old Man of Lochnagar, HRH The Prince of Wales with illustrations by Sir Hugh Casson, London : Hamilton, 1980, 

Casson's biography was published in 2000.

References 

1910 births
1999 deaths
20th-century English architects
Royal Academicians
People educated at Eastbourne College
Academics of the Royal College of Art
Alumni of St John's College, Cambridge
Alumni of The Bartlett
Knights Commander of the Royal Victorian Order
Camoufleurs
People from Hampstead
People from Chelsea, London
Architects from London
Knights Bachelor